Andrew Lloyd Lewis (born 1963) is a retired admiral in the United States Navy who last served as the commander of the United States Second Fleet and NATO Joint Force Command for the Atlantic. Lewis previously served as the Deputy Chief of Naval Operations for Operations, Plans and Strategy. He took command of the United States Second Fleet upon its reestablishment on August 24, 2018.

Early life and education
Lewis was raised in Los Altos, California, and attended the United States Naval Academy where he received his commission after graduation in 1985. Lewis was designated a naval aviator in 1987 and has also attended the Air Command and Staff College, the Armed Forces Staff College, and holds a master's degree in military history from the University of Alabama.

Career

He has also served as an instructor pilot as well as an exchange officer with the Royal Navy aboard . Lewis has flown over 100 combat missions with over 5,300 flights hours in both the A-7 Corsair II and the F/A-18 Hornet. He has also held foreign postings in Qatar at Al Udeid Air Base and in Bahrain at United States Naval Forces Central Command.

Prior to being promoted to vice admiral in 2017, Lewis served as the vice director of operations for the Joint Staff. He has also served as vice director for operations and director of fleet training at Fleet Forces Command. Lewis became Deputy Chief of Naval Operations for Operations, Plans and Strategy in August 2017 and was nominated to take command of the newly reestablished Second Fleet on June 12, 2018. Lewis was confirmed on June 18, 2018 and assumed command of the Second Fleet upon its formal reactivation on August 24, 2018.

All of Lewis's operational command tours have been centered on the United States East Coast and in late 2018 he assumed command of the newly created NATO Joint Force Command Norfolk based in Norfolk, Virginia which is dual-hatted with the Second Fleet. With the announcement of Daniel W. Dwyer to succeed him as Second Fleet commander in June 2021, Lewis is expected to retire. He relinquished command of Second Fleet to Dwyer on August 20, 2021.

Awards and decorations
Since receiving his commission, Lewis has received the Navy Distinguished Service Medal, the Defense Superior Service Medal with oak leaf cluster, the Legion of Merit (six awards), the Bronze Star Medal, the Defense Meritorious Service Medal, the Meritorious Service Medal, the Air Medal (seven Strike Flight and four Individual with Combat "V"), the Navy and Marine Corps Commendation Medal (three awards, two with Combat "V"), and the Navy and Marine Corps Achievement Medal, among a number of other decorations.

In 1996, Lewis was named the Naval Air Forces Pacific Pilot of the Year.

Works
The Revolt of the Admirals, Air Command and Staff College, Maxwell Air Force Base, April 1998.

References

External links

 

1963 births
Living people
Place of birth missing (living people)
People from Los Altos, California
United States Naval Academy alumni
Military personnel from California
United States Naval Aviators
University of Alabama alumni
Air Command and Staff College alumni
Joint Forces Staff College alumni
Recipients of the Legion of Merit
United States Navy admirals
Recipients of the Defense Superior Service Medal
Recipients of the Navy Distinguished Service Medal